GSS Infotech (formerly "GSS America") was established in 1999, as an Information technology company headquartered in Hyderabad, India. The company provides services related to cloud computing, remote infrastructure management, virtualization, application management, and other services.

GSS Infotech has offices in Connecticut, New Jersey and Hyderabad.

History
GSS Infotech was formed in 1999 as "GSS America". On 10 March 2011, the company was renamed "GSS Infotech". GSS Infotech offers services primarily to telecommunication, banking and financial services, insurance, healthcare, retail, and government organizations. In 2006, the company established a Global Delivery Center in Hyderabad, India and became a CMMI Level 5 company in 2011.

In November 2010, GSS America Infotech Ltd. acquired US based companies with revenues of $30 million to increase its portfolio.

In GSS Infotech's annual meeting in December 2010, the company passed the resolution to raise around Rs 337.50 crore ($75 million) by means of foreign currency convertible bonds, American Depository Receipts or other instruments.

Revenue
GSS Infotech net profit rose by 0.40% to Rs 2.50 crore in the quarter ended December 2010 as against Rs 2.49 crore during the previous quarter ended December 2009. The sales increased by 71.88% to Rs 17.79 crore in the quarter ended December 2010 in contrast to Rs 10.35 crore during the previous quarter ended December 2009.

GSS Infotech net profit rose by 70.73% to Rs 2.80 crore in the quarter that ended March 2011 as against Rs 1.64 crore during the previous quarter.

Acquisitions

  In 2006, GSS Infotech acquired Infospectrum Consulting Inc, a business service management (BSM) solution provider based out of Illinois, USA.
  In 2008, GSS Infotech acquired System Dynamix Corporation, an IT consulting and software development company based in Connecticut, USA
  In 2009, GSS Infotech acquired ATEC Group, an infrastructure technology solution provider based out of New York, USA.
  In 2010, GSS Infotech acquired Veloce
  In 2019, GSS Infotech acquired Nexii Labs
 In 2021, GSS Infotech acquired Polimerras.

Recognition
 Forbes' list of Asia's 200 Best Under $1 Billion 2008
 Forbes' list of Asia's 200 Best Under $1 Billion 2009
 Forbes' list of Asia's 200 Best Under $1 Billion 2010

References

External links 
 

Information technology companies of India
Companies based in Hyderabad, India
Software companies of India
Indian companies established in 1999
1999 establishments in Andhra Pradesh
Companies listed on the National Stock Exchange of India
Companies listed on the Bombay Stock Exchange